National Tertiary Route 734, or just Route 734 (or ) is a National Road Route of Costa Rica, located in the Alajuela, Guanacaste provinces.

Description
In Alajuela province the route covers San Carlos canton (Venado district).

In Guanacaste province the route covers Tilarán canton (Arenal district).

References

Highways in Costa Rica